The Grizzly Giant is a giant sequoia in Yosemite National Park's Mariposa Grove.

The Grizzly Giant is the oldest sequoia in the Mariposa Grove, the largest giant sequoia grove in Yosemite National Park, with several hundred mature specimens. At one time, the Grizzly Giant was considered the oldest and largest tree in the world, aged between 2,000 and 3,000 years. In 2019, refined scientific dating methods resulted in a new age estimate for the Grizzly Giant: 2,995 years old (plus or minus 250 years).

On July 16, 2022, the Washburn Fire threatened Grizzly Giant and other trees in Mariposa Grove. The National Park Service used sprinklers to protect the famous tree.

Dimensions

See also
List of largest giant sequoias
List of individual trees

References

Geology of U.S. Parklands: Fifth Edition, Eugene P. Kiver and David V. Harris (John Wiley & Sons; New York; 1999; page 227)

External links
Yosemite and the Mariposa Grove: A Preliminary Report, 1865
An article about the grove from the National Geographic Society
Record from the 38th Congress including the 1864 Act granting the grove to California
Record from the 59th Congress returning the grove to federal control

Individual giant sequoia trees
Yosemite National Park